Alexander Ostroumov Bryner (born July 26, 1943) is a Chinese-born Russian American retired lawyer and jurist. Bryner was a justice of the Supreme Court of Alaska from February 1997 to October 2007.

Born in Tientsin, China in 1943 to Russian immigrant parents, Bryner was raised in Menlo Park, California. He received his J.D. from Stanford University in 1969, thereafter moving to Alaska and serving as a law clerk for Alaska Supreme Court Chief Justice George Boney. He returned to Alaska to settle permanently in Anchorage in 1972. Bryner served as the U.S. attorney for Alaska from 1977 to 1980, when he was appointed to the newly created Alaska Court of Appeals. He served as that court's chief judge until he was appointed to the Supreme Court, replacing that court's longest-serving justice, Jay Rabinowitz. Bryner retired in 2007.

References

External links

|-

|-

1943 births
Justices of the Alaska Supreme Court
American people of Russian descent
Chinese emigrants to the United States
Living people
Lawyers from Anchorage, Alaska
People from Menlo Park, California
United States Attorneys for the District of Alaska
Politicians from Anchorage, Alaska
Chief Justices of the Alaska Supreme Court